The 2003–04 season was the 63rd season in Albacete Balompié's history.

Squad
Retrieved on 30 December 2020

Out on loan

Transfers

In

Out

Squad stats 
Last updated on 29 December 2020.

|-
|colspan="14"|Players who have left the club after the start of the season:

|}

Competitions

Overall

La Liga

League table

Matches

Copa del Rey

References

Albacete Balompié seasons
Albacete Balompié